Viejas Mountain is a mountain in San Diego County in the U.S. state of California. At , Viejas Mountain is the 48th tallest peak in San Diego County. The mountain can be seen from parts of metropolitan San Diego.

References

External links 
 

Mountains of San Diego County, California
Mountains of Southern California